The Qarabağ 2010–11 season was Qarabağ's 18th Azerbaijan Premier League season, and their third season under Gurban Gurbanov. They finished the season in 3rd place, and were knocked out of the 2010–11 Azerbaijan Cup at the Last 16 stage by Turan Tovuz. They also participated in the 2010–11 UEFA Europa League, entering at the first qualifying round stage. They beat Metalurg Skopje of Macedonia, before beating Portadown of Northern Ireland in the second qualifying round. Next they beat Wisła Kraków of Poland in the second qualifying round to make them the first Azerbaijani team to reach the Play-off Round of the Europa League. In this round they were defeated by Borussia Dortmund of Germany 5-0 on aggregate.

Squad

Transfers

Summer

In:

Out:

Winter

In:

Out:

Competitions

Azerbaijan Premier League

First round

Results

Table

Championship group

Results

Table

Azerbaijan Cup

UEFA Europa League

Qualifying phase

Squad statistics

Appearances and goals

|}

Goal scorers

Disciplinary record

References 
Qarabağ have played their home games at the Tofiq Bahramov Stadium since 1993 due to the ongoing situation in Quzanlı.
Played in Skopje at Philip II Arena as Metalurg Skopje's Železarnica Stadium did not meet UEFA criteria.

External links
 Qarabağ at Soccerway.com

Qarabag
Qarabağ FK seasons